The 2016 Rally America season is the 12th consecutive season of the Rally America series. The Rally America series is currently the premiere stage rally championship in the United States. The season consists of eight events across the country.

Championship Standings
This table represents the current championship standings from the 2016 Rally America season. Competitors that start each event get one point, competitors that finish get another point, and then further points are determined by placing order at the end of the event. 1st place receives 20 points, 2nd place receives 15 points, 3rd place receives 12 points and so on. The table underneath shows how points are distributed. 

*In the above table, where noted, certain events and their points are dropped from the championship total. This is because there are only 6 allowed events in the national championship. This allows competitors that race in all 8 events to drop their two worst scores leaving them with 6 total races. Since the season is not yet over, many of the dropped races are estimated by worst placing finish, and will be determined at a later date.

References

External links
Official website

Rally America seasons
America
Rally America